The 2005 Yonex All England Open was the 95th edition of the All England Open Badminton Championships. It was a four star tournament held in Birmingham, England, from 8 to 13 March 2005.

Venue
National Indoor Arena

Final results

Men's singles

Section 1

Section 2

Women's singles

Section 1

Section 2

References

All England Open Badminton Championships
All England Open
All England
Sports competitions in Birmingham, West Midlands
March 2005 sports events in the United Kingdom